The Somain to Péruwelz railway was one of the first railways in France. It opened in October 1838, linking Abscon in the department du Nord with Saint Waast-la-Haut. It was gradually extended, and by 1874 it linked Somain in France with Péruwelz in Belgium. At its peak, the line had a length of 25 miles.

History
The line was opened in sections:
21 October 1838: Abscon - Saint-Waast-la-Haut
January 1842: Saint-Waast - Anzin Mines
20 June 1848: Somain - Abscon
23 May 1873: Vieux-Condé - Péruwelz
1 June 1874: Anzin - Vieux-Condé

The line was closed to passengers in 1963. The section between Péruwelz and Vieux Condé was dismantled in 1975, and freight traffic ended on the remainder of the line on 17 November 1986. Part of the former route of the railway is now being used for the Valenciennes Tramway.

Route
The line served the following stations: Gare de Somain; Abscon, km 4; Escaudain, km 7; Denain, km 10; Hérin, km 15; Saint-Waast (Valenciennes), km 18; Anzin, km 19; Le Moulin, km 21; Bruay, km 23; Thiers la Grange, km 25; Escautpont-Mines, km 27; Fresnes, km 28; Condé, km 30; Vieux-Condé, km 32; Frontière passage, km 37; Péruwelz, km 40.

Gallery

References

Railway lines in Hauts-de-France
Cross-border railway lines in France